This article lists every electric-powered multiple unit allocated a TOPS classification or used on the mainline network since 1948, i.e. British Railways and post-privatisation. For a historical overview of electric multiple unit development in Great Britain, see British electric multiple units.

British Rail operated a wide variety of electric multiple units for use on electrified lines:

 AC units operate off  (AC) from overhead wires. The Midland Railway units used . Under the computer numbering, AC units (including mixed-voltage units that can also work off a DC supply) were given a class in the range 300-399.
 DC units operate off  (DC) from a third rail on the Southern Region and North London, Merseyside and Tyneside networks. The Manchester-Bury Railway line used  from a side-contact third rail. The Manchester South Junction & Altrincham and "Woodhead" and initially the Great Eastern Railway routes used  from overhead wires. Under the computer numbering, DC units were given a class in the range 400-599.

AC EMUs and dual-voltage EMUs

First generation

Second generation

Modern/Third generation
These use solid state switching devices (thyristors and transistors) and have electronic power control.

High speed trains
High speed multiple unit or fixed formation trainsets, capable of operating at speeds above .

DC EMUs

Southern Region units
The Southern Railway and its successor, the Southern Region of British Rail, used three letter codes to classify their DC EMU fleets, as shown after the TOPS class numbers. Southern Region EMUs were classified in the 400 series under TOPS.

Pre-Nationalisation

Mark 1 and 2 bodyshell

Tube Stock

Modern EMUs

Other DC units
The 500 series classes were reserved for  miscellaneous DC EMUs not from the Southern Region. This included the DC (third/fourth rail) lines in North London, Manchester and Merseyside and the OHLE lines in Greater Manchester. The DC electric network around Tyneside had been de-electrified by the time TOPS was introduced, and the stock withdrawn or transferred to the Southern Region.

TOPS classes

Pre-TOPS classes
 Ex-LNER units (Tyneside stock)
 Ex-LNWR units (North London stock)
 Ex-LOR units (Liverpool Overhead Railway stock)
 Ex-LYR units (Manchester-Bury stock)
 Ex-Mersey Railway units (Merseyside DC stock)
 Ex-W&CR units (Waterloo & City Railway stock)

Battery electric multiple unit (BEMU)
The original BEMU was a one-off unit, withdrawn before the introduction of TOPS. A new generation battery EMU (called an Independently Powered Electric Multiple Unit) was created in 2014, converted from a Class 379.

Non National Rail units
All rail vehicles operating on Network Rail infrastructure are required to be given TOPS codes. For this reason, London Underground, Sheffield Supertram and Tyne & Wear Metro trains have their own TOPS classes:

See also
 List of British Rail diesel multiple unit classes
 British Rail locomotive and multiple unit numbering and classification
 SR multiple unit numbering and classification
 British Rail coach type codes
 Electric multiple unit

References

 List
British Rail electric multiple unit classes
British Rail rolling stock
Electric multiple units of Great Britain
British Rail